Kenneth Valentine Barnes (14 February 1933 – 4 August 2015) was a British writer, record producer, broadcaster, musicologist, film historian, film maker, songwriter and music publisher.

Born in Middlesbrough, Barnes was educated in Redcar, and did his National Service in the Royal Corps of Signals. He trained as a draughtsman after leaving the army, but his interest in jazz, swing and the Great American Songbook led him to London in the 1960s, where he worked in marketing for Polydor and Decca Records before becoming a record producer.

In the 1970s, Barnes worked with Bing Crosby, Peter Sellers, Frankie Laine, Peggy Lee and Fred Astaire. In 1974, he convinced Johnny Mercer to record a two-disk collection of Mercer singing Mercer, with Johnny selecting his own favourites. These were the last recordings made by Mercer before his death in 1976.

Barnes also published several books, contributed liner notes for reissue albums, and wrote comedy scripts for BBC TV. For BBC Radio and TV, he wrote over 90 scripts, as well as special material for Parkinson. He also wrote for comedians including Roy Hudd and Les Dawson. In America, Barnes wrote special material for Crosby, Fred Astaire, Gene Kelly and Peter Sellers, amongst others.

Barnes was the founder and CEO of The Laureate Company, a music and movie restoration company.  He wrote and delivered the DVD audio commentary on Citizen Kane (1941) and Holiday Inn (1942), starring Astaire and Crosby. The DVD also featured a supplementary documentary, A Couple of Song and Dance Men, in which he appears with Astaire's daughter, Ava Astaire-MacKenzie.

Barnes died in 2015, aged 82, after a long battle with diabetes. He was married to Anne.

Works
 Sinatra and the great song stylists (Ian Allan: 1972) .
 20 Years of Pop (Kenneth Mason: 1974) .
 The Crosby Years, by Ken Barnes (New York: St. Martins, 1980) (London: Elm Tree Books, 1980) .
 Anatomy of a Classic written, produced & directed by Ken Barnes (Film: Universal Home Video).
 A Couple of Song and Dance Men written, produced and directed by Ken Barnes (Film: Universal Home Video).
 Johnny Mercer - The Dream's On Me written by Ken Barnes, executive producer: Clint Eastwood, director: Bruce Ricker (TCM/Warner Home Video). Emmy nomination 2010: "Best Non Fiction Special".
 The Sea Dogs. Novel by Ken Barnes (SBPRA: 2014) .

References

External links 

 Laureate DVD Website

1933 births
2015 deaths
People from Middlesbrough
British record producers
British film historians